The 2020 Tour Colombia was a road cycling stage race that took place in Colombia between 11 and 16 February 2020. It was the third edition of the Tour Colombia, and was rated as a 2.1 event as part of the UCI America Tour.

Teams
Twenty-seven teams were invited to start the race. These included six UCI WorldTeams, six UCI Professional Continental teams, 10 UCI Continental teams and five national teams. Of the starting peloton of 161 riders, 131 finished.

UCI WorldTeams

 
 
 
 
 
 

UCI Professional Continental Teams

 
 
 
 
 
 

UCI Continental Teams

 
 
 
 
 
 
 
 
 
 

National Teams

 Brazil
 Colombia
 Ecuador
 Russia
 Venezuela

Route

Stages

Stage 1
11 February 2020 – Tunja to Tunja,  (TTT)

Stage 2
12 February 2020 – Paipa to Duitama,

Stage 3
13 February 2020 – Paipa to Sogamoso,

Stage 4
14 February 2020 – Paipa to Santa Rosa de Viterbo,

Stage 5
15 February 2020 – Paipa to Zipaquirá,

Stage 6
16 February 2020 – Zipaquirá to El Once/Alto del Verjón,

Classification leadership table

Final standings

General classification

Points classification

Mountains classification

Young rider classification

Teams classification

References

External links

2020
2020 UCI America Tour
2020 in Colombian sport
February 2020 sports events in South America